Kondratowice  is a village in Strzelin County, Lower Silesian Voivodeship, in south-western Poland. It is the seat of the administrative district (gmina) called Gmina Kondratowice.

The village has a population of 820.

References

Villages in Strzelin County